Post University is a private for-profit university in Waterbury, Connecticut. It was founded in 1890 as Post College. From 1990 to 2004 it was affiliated with Teikyo University in Tokyo, Japan and during that time it was named Teikyo Post University. The university offers over 25 undergraduate and graduate programs in day, evening, and online courses with most of its students participating exclusively online. It has satellite centers in Meriden, Danbury, and Wallingford.

History 
Post University was founded in 1890 as Matoon Shorthand School. The school offered training in typing, bookkeeping, business writing, and other courses.  In 1897, Harry C. Post acquired the school and renamed the school Waterbury Business College, where he became the college's first principal. The school again changed its name in 1931 to Post College, where it would keep its namesake until 1990.

Post College saw continued growth to its campus and program offerings. In 1965, the school moved to its current location on Country Club Road in Waterbury, Connecticut. Harold B. Leever was named chair of the board of trustees.  The Leever Student Center is named in his honor.  The school expanded again by adding the Traurig Library in honor of Rose Traurig. In 1970, the school opened its first off-campus site in Meriden, Connecticut.

In 1976, Post College became a four-year institution and began offering accelerated degree programs aimed at helping Vietnam veterans earn college degrees. In 1980, the college began offering baccalaureate degrees, and a few years later acquired its athletic facilities to support men's and women's varsity sports.

In the 1990s, the school became affiliated with Teikyo University and changed its name to Teikyo Post University. The school had an influx of international students and new online programs.

In 2004, the school changed to a new board of trustees and became Post University. The school expanded its liberal arts programs and graduate-level courses. In 2007, Post offered Connecticut's first fully online Master of Business Administration degree program. In 2012, the business school was renamed to Malcolm Baldrige School of Business, after former United States Secretary of Commerce Malcolm Baldrige, Jr.

In 2021, Post University announced its intentions to acquire American Sentinel University, a for-profit college with 1400 undergraduate students and 1300 graduate students. The school will become American Sentinel College of Nursing and Health Sciences at Post University.

Campus 
Post University sits on a  campus located near Interstate 84 (Yankee Expressway) in Waterbury, Connecticut.

Post Tree 

The Post Tree is a Camperdown elm (Ulmus Camperdownii) that once served as the backdrop for the university's logo. The tree measures 13 feet in height with an average spread of 28 feet. The trunk's circumference is 110 inches. The Post Tree is over a half century old, in 2014 it was added to the list of Connecticut's Notable Trees, and has become part of Connecticut's natural historic record.  The elm has been used for student events and as a place to take photos.

Residence halls 
There are six student residence halls on campus. West Hall houses approximately 100 first-year students and was renovated in 2011.  Middle Hall houses approximately 44 first-year students.  Paparazzo Hall houses 44 first-year students and was renovated in 2013.  South Hall houses approximately 60 upperclassmen students and was renovated in 2012.  East Hall houses approximately 60 upperclassmen students.  Okinaga Hall is the newest constructed apartment-style residence hall for upperclassmen.

Torrance Hall 

Torrance Hall houses main campus admissions and the president's office. It was the former home to Walter Torrance and family and was renovated in 1965 after a fire destroyed the back of the building.

Traurig Library 
The Traurig Library has one floor and stores over 13,000 books and media, as well as a boardroom for meetings, and the office for academic affairs.

Campus Halls 
Hess Hall features classrooms, the registrar, the financial aid office, human resources, and IT.  North hall houses Career Services, the Communications Office, Associate Faculty lounge, Commuter Student Lounge, and the Photography Lab.  MacDermid Hall has chemistry and biology labs and classrooms, and the university's largest lecture hall.  The art department facilities are also found here, including two studio spaces and a ceramics kiln.  The Leever Student Center has the Campus Store, Eagle's Nest – common area for special events and club meetings, the dining hall, cyber café, and Counseling Center.

LaMoy Field 
LaMoy Field is a multipurpose facility to support Post's athletic programs and football team.  The field was updated to a turf field in 2011. Next to the turf field is the softball field, featuring a turf outfield and a clay infield, and dugouts.

Drubner Fitness Center 
Drubner Fitness Center ("Drub") supports the basketball, volleyball, and tennis teams. The facility also houses the campus fitness center, weight room and esports lab.

Administration 
The organization is a private, for-profit school; since 2004, it has been a wholly owned subsidiary of Post Education, Inc., a Delaware C corporation. John L. Hopkins is the current president and CEO.  Dr. Don Mroz was president of Post University and was founding dean of the Malcolm Baldrige School of Business. In 2016 John L. Hopkins was named chief executive officer of Post University

Accreditation 
Post University is accredited the New England Commission of Higher Education (NECHE). The Malcolm Baldrige School of Business is nationally accredited by the Accreditation Council for Business Schools and Programs (ACBSP).

Athletics

Post University, known athletically as the Eagles, is a member of the National Collegiate Athletic Association Division II, primarily competing in the Central Atlantic Collegiate Conference (CACC). Men's sports include baseball, basketball, cross country, golf, ice hockey, lacrosse, soccer, football, tennis, and track and field; while women's sports include basketball, bowling, cross country, golf, hockey, lacrosse, soccer, softball, tennis, track and field, and volleyball. Non-varsity programs include cheerleading, and equestrian sports (IDA dressage, IHSA hunt seat, and IHSA western). The university has also exploded onto the esports scene. A state-of-the-art esports lab was opened on their main campus in 2022, giving their 11+ esports teams a place to call home.

Notable alumni 
 Gregory C. Knight, adjutant general of the Vermont National Guard beginning in 2019
 Jazmín Benítez, professional wrestler better known by her ring name, Mercedes Martinez.
 Mario Abdo Benítez, president of Paraguay
 Selim Noujaim, member of the Connecticut House of Representatives

References

External links
Official website
Official athletics website

 
Educational institutions established in 1890
Private universities and colleges in Connecticut
Buildings and structures in Waterbury, Connecticut
Universities and colleges in New Haven County, Connecticut
For-profit universities and colleges in the United States
Ice hockey teams in Connecticut
1890 establishments in Connecticut